is a Japanese football player who plays for the football team Júbilo Iwata.

Playing career
Nakagawa was born in Chiba Prefecture on June 1, 1999. He joined J1 League club Kashiwa Reysol from youth team in 2018. On 30 December 2019 it was confirmed, that Nakagawa had joined Júbilo Iwata.

Club statistics
Updated to end of 2018 season.

References

External links

1999 births
Living people
Association football people from Chiba Prefecture
Japanese footballers
J1 League players
J2 League players
J3 League players
Kashiwa Reysol players
SC Sagamihara players
Júbilo Iwata players
Association football defenders